The striated darter (Etheostoma striatulum) is a species of freshwater ray-finned fish, a darter from the subfamily Etheostomatinae, part of the family Percidae, which also contains the perches, ruffes and pikeperches. It is endemic to the eastern United States. It occurs in the Duck River system in Tennessee. It inhabits rocky pools in creeks.

References

Freshwater fish of the United States
Etheostoma
Fish described in 1977
Taxonomy articles created by Polbot